Quezaltepeque is a municipality, with a population of 28,075 (2018 census) and an area of 239 km2, in the Chiquimula department of Guatemala. The local economy is based on agriculture. Agricultural products include coffee, maize and beans.  As of 1993, there was a working telegraph terminal there in the post office.

Etymology
Quetzaltepēc is Nahuatl for "At the quetzal-feather hill". The British spelled it Quesaltpeque, in the 19th century.

Population

As of 1850, the municipality had an estimated population of 4,000.

References

Municipalities of the Chiquimula Department